John Joseph Feild (born 1978), better known as JJ Feild,  is a British American film, television, and theatre actor. He started his television career in 1999. Feild played Fred Garland in Philip Pullman's The Ruby in the Smoke and The Shadow in the North television adaptations. In 2007, he starred as Henry Tilney in the television film Northanger Abbey. The following year, he made his West End debut in a production of Ring Round the Moon. From 2014 to 2016, Feild portrayed Major John André in Turn: Washington's Spies. Feild's film credits include Telstar (2009), Captain America: The First Avenger (2011), Austenland (2013), and Professor Marston and the Wonder Women (2017).

Early life and education
John Joseph Feild was born in Boulder, Colorado, to English writer and former musician Reshad Feild and his American wife. Feild and his parents moved to London when he was six months old (he says he "never walked in America"). His parents later divorced and both remarried.

Career
Feild received his first television role in 1999, and has since appeared in several films and television shows. He played the role of Simon Doyle in the Poirot series adaptation of Death on the Nile, and as Paul Osbourne in the Marple version of The Pale Horse. He has also appeared in Reach for the Moon, Northanger Abbey as Henry Tilney, and as Frederick Garland in the BBC adaptations of Philip Pullman's  The Ruby in the Smoke and The Shadow in the North. His film roles include playing the younger version of Michael Caine's character in Last Orders, Hamish in The Intended, and the role of Heinz in Telstar.

In 2008, he made his West End debut in Ring Round the Moon. In 2009, he appeared in the RTÉ drama, Pure Mule, as Tom Stafford, the English boyfriend to main protagonist Jennifer. In 2011, Feild co-starred in Captain America: The First Avenger as James Montgomery Falsworth. The same year, he starred alongside Benedict Cumberbatch in Third Star and appeared in the BBC adaptation of Sarah Waters' The Night Watch. He appeared as Henry Nobley in Jerusha Hess's adaptation of Shannon Hale's novel Austenland in 2013. Feild filmed a role in Not Safe for Work in 2012.

Feild appeared in the BBC's The Musketeers as Marsac in 2014. From 2014 to 2016, Feild starred as Major John André in Turn: Washington's Spies on AMC. He has been cast in the film adaptation of La sonrisa etrusca, alongside Brian Cox, Thora Birch and Rosanna Arquette.

Feild plays automotive engineer Roy Lunn in the 2018 biographical film Ford v. Ferrari. In 2019, he starred alongside Idris Elba and Piper Perabo in the Netflix comedy series, Turn Up Charlie. He also played the recurring role of Captain Ben Adler in Netflix's Lost in Space. The following year, Feild appeared in an episode of AMC anthology series Soulmates. He appeared in the Amazon Prime Video series The Peripheral, and period romance film Prisoners of Paradise.

Personal life 
Feild has owned residences both in Los Angeles and in London since 2009.

He has been in a relationship with actress Neve Campbell since 2011. In March 2012, the couple confirmed that Campbell was expecting their first child together. Campbell gave birth to their son Caspian in August 2012. On 29 June 2018, Campbell announced she and Feild had adopted a son in January 2018.

Filmography

Film

Television

Theatre work

References

External links
 

1978 births
Alumni of the Webber Douglas Academy of Dramatic Art
American male film actors
American male stage actors
American male television actors
American people of English descent
English male film actors
English male stage actors
English male television actors
Living people
Male actors from Boulder, Colorado
Male actors from London
People educated at Fine Arts College
People educated at St Christopher School, Letchworth
American emigrants to England
American expatriates in England